Diego Peña  is a Colombian male track cyclist, representing Colombia at international competitions. He won the silver medal at the 2016 Pan American Track Cycling Championships in the 1 km time trial.

References

Year of birth missing (living people)
Living people
Colombian male cyclists
Colombian track cyclists
Place of birth missing (living people)
21st-century Colombian people